Murray Alper (January 11, 1904 – November 16, 1984) was an American actor. He appeared in numerous television series, films, and Broadway productions.

Biography
Born in New York City in 1904, Alper worked on Broadway from 1927 to 1940 in a number of shows including The Wild Man of Borneo, This is New York, Broadway Boy, Sailor Beware!, and Every Man for Himself.

Alper appeared in more than 200 films and TV series from the 1930s to the end of the 1960s. Quite often his work was uncredited and he never received a top billing in one of his movies. His first known screen credit was in The Royal Family of Broadway (1930) a part he had already played on Broadway in 1927/28.

His signature character was a chatty taxi driver, which he played at least 20 times, most notably in The Maltese Falcon (1941) as a friendly cabbie who drives Sam Spade, played by Humphrey Bogart, during a mid-film wild goose chase, as well as in such other well-known films as The Big Broadcast of 1937, Lady in the Dark and Angel on My Shoulder. His biggest role should have been the part of Gus Smith in the Alfred Hitchcock film Lifeboat in 1943. Due to his becoming ill right before the start of shooting in August, he was replaced by actor William Bendix. However, he worked for Hitchcock on three other movies: Mr. & Mrs. Smith (1941), again as a cabbie, Saboteur (1942), and Strangers on a Train (1951).

Frequently seen in comedies, Alper was featured in the Three Stooges films Tricky Dicks (1953) and The Outlaws Is Coming (1965). One of Alper's least characteristic roles was the judo instructor in Jerry Lewis' The Nutty Professor (1963).

Selected filmography

 The Royal Family of Broadway (1930) - McDermott
 The Girl Habit (1931) - Hood
 Little Big Shot (1935) - Doré's Henchman #22
 Navy Wife (1935) - Sam (uncredited)
 The Public Menace (1935) - Stiglitz
 Hands Across the Table (1935) - Cabbie (uncredited)
 Seven Keys to Baldpate (1935) - Max the Monk
 The Milky Way (1935) - Cabbie with Little Agnes (uncredited)
 Two in Revolt (1936) - Andy
 Panic on the Air (1936) - Martin Danker
 Murder on a Bridle Path (1936) - Taxi Driver (uncredited)
 High Tension (1936) - Chuck
 Lady Be Careful (1936) - Mattie
 The Big Broadcast of 1937 (1936) - Taxi Driver (uncredited)
 Winterset (1936) - Louie (uncredited)
 After the Thin Man (1936) - The Kid (uncredited)
 Sea Devils (1937) - Seaman Brown
 When's Your Birthday? (1937) - Dustin's Trainer (uncredited)
 23 1/2 Hours Leave (1937) - Sgt. Schultz
 You Can't Buy Luck (1937) - Chauffeur Spike Connors
 Riding on Air (1937) - Gunner in Mob Plane (uncredited)
 The Singing Marine (1937) - Marine (uncredited)
 Escape by Night (1937) - Horace 'Red' Graham
 That's My Story (1937) - Blackie
 Big Town Girl (1937) - Marty
 Change of Heart (1938) - Plumber (uncredited)
 Island in the Sky (1938) - Blackie - Doyle's Henchman (uncredited)
 Cocoanut Grove (1938) - Concessionaire (uncredited)
 Gold Diggers in Paris (1938) - Taxi Driver (uncredited)
 Passport Husband (1938) - Baggage Man (uncredited)
 Keep Smiling (1938) - Projectionist 'Shorty' (uncredited)
 The Arkansas Traveler (1938) - Hobo, Frogeyes
 Young Dr. Kildare (1938) - Blue Swan Waiter (uncredited)
 Submarine Patrol (1938) - Orderly in Maitland's Office (uncredited)
 The Cowboy and the Lady (1938) - Cowboy at Ranch (uncredited)
 Next Time I Marry (1938) - Joe
 Road Demon (1938) - Hap Flynn
 King of the Underworld (1939) - Eddie
 The Great Man Votes (1939) - Tri-County Distribution Truck Driver (uncredited)
 Tail Spin (1939) - Albuquerque Mechanic (uncredited)
 Twelve Crowded Hours (1939) - Louie Allen
 Rose of Washington Square (1939) - Eddie - Candy Butcher (uncredited)
 It's a Wonderful World (1939) - Newspaper Man at Ferry Landing (uncredited)
 Bachelor Mother (1939) - Dance Floor Gatekeeper at 'The Pink Slipper' (uncredited)
 Stop, Look and Love (1939) - Pete (uncredited)
 The Roaring Twenties (1939) - Fletcher's Mechanic (uncredited)
 Another Thin Man (1939) - Larry - a Father (uncredited)
 The Night of Nights (1939) - Muggins
 The Big Guy (1939) - Williams
 The Lone Wolf Strikes (1940) - Pete (uncredited)
 Black Friday (1940) - Bellhop
 Double Alibi (1940) - Joe - Counterman (uncredited)
 I Can't Give You Anything But Love, Baby (1940) - Nails
 My Favorite Wife (1940) - Yosemite Bartender (uncredited)
 Turnabout (1940) - Masseur
 Gambling on the High Seas (1940) - Louie
 Sailor's Lady (1940) - Sailor (uncredited)
 Manhattan Heartbeat (1940) - Mechanic
 Blondie Has Servant Trouble (1940) - Taxi Driver (uncredited)
 Lucky Partners (1940) - Orchestra Leader (uncredited)
 The Bride Wore Crutches (1940) - Izzy (uncredited)
 City for Conquest (1940) - Taxi Driver (uncredited)
 East of the River (1940) - Dink Rogers, Blackjack Player (uncredited)
 Street of Memories (1940) - Taxicab Driver (uncredited)
 Mr. & Mrs. Smith (1941) - Harold - Taxi Driver (uncredited)
 Affectionately Yours (1941) - Blair
 Out of the Fog (1941) - Drug Store Soda Jerk (uncredited)
 Caught in the Draft (1941) - Make-Up Man (uncredited)
 Sergeant York (1941) - But! Boy (uncredited)
 Bullets for O'Hara (1941) - Singing Messenger (uncredited)
 My Life with Caroline (1941) - Jenkins
 Manpower (1941) - Lineman (uncredited)
 Navy Blues (1941) - Sailor in Storeroom (uncredited)
 The Maltese Falcon (1941) - Frank Richman
 Down Mexico Way (1941) - Flood
 Married Bachelor (1941) - Sleeper
 Dangerously They Live (1941) - Miller, Psychopathic Ward Guard (uncredited)
 You're in the Army Now (1941) - Supply Man: Hats (uncredited)
 Call Out the Marines (1942) - Military Policeman (uncredited)
 Obliging Young Lady (1942) - Pickup Driver with Red (uncredited)
 The Lady Is Willing (1942) - Joe Quig
 Saboteur (1942) - Truck Driver
 My Favorite Spy (1942) - Kay's 1st Taxi Driver (uncredited)
 Yankee Doodle Dandy (1942) - Wise Guy (uncredited)
 Powder Town (1942) - Joe, Cab Driver (uncredited)
 The Big Shot (1942) - Quinto, a Convict
 Escape from Crime (1942) - Fingerprint Man's Assistant (uncredited)
 The Gay Sisters (1942) - Elevator Operator (uncredited)
 Mug Town (1942) - Shorty
 No Time for Love (1943) - Moran (uncredited)
 Lady Bodyguard (1943) - Attendant (uncredited)
 The Hard Way (1943) - Joe Duglatz (uncredited)
 Air Force (1943) - Butch - Demolition Squad Corporal (uncredited)
 Good Morning, Judge (1943) - Charlie Martin (uncredited)
 Bombardier (1943) - Little Boy - Spy (uncredited)
 Hers to Hold (1943) - Smiley, the Foreman
 This Is the Army (1943) - Soldier (uncredited)
 The Good Fellows (1943) - Cummings (uncredited)
 Larceny with Music (1943) - Cab Driver
 Corvette K-225 (1943) - Jones
 Swing Fever (1943) - Burly Attentant (uncredited)
 Lady in the Dark (1944) - Taxicab Driver (uncredited)
 Once Upon a Time (1944) - Soldier Leaving Theatre (uncredited)
 The Eve of St. Mark (1944) - Sgt. Kriven
 Roger Touhy, Gangster (1944) - Ralph Burke (uncredited)
 Wing and a Prayer (1944) - Benjamin K. 'Benny 'O'Neill
 Moonlight and Cactus (1944) - Slugger
 Something for the Boys (1944) - Army Desk Sergeant (uncredited)
 Army Wives (1944) - Mike
 God Is My Co-Pilot (1945) - Sgt. Altonen (uncredited)
 The Power of the Whistler (1945) - Joe Blainey, Elite Bakery Truck Driver (uncredited)
 The Horn Blows at Midnight (1945) - Tony - the Hotel Bell Captain (uncredited)
 Honeymoon Ahead (1945) - Spike
 They Were Expendable (1945) - 'Slug' Mahan T.M. 1c
 Up Goes Maisie (1946) - Mitch O'Hara
 The Phantom Thief (1946) - Eddie Alexander, Chauffeur
 Angel on My Shoulder (1946) - Jim - Taxicab Driver (uncredited)
 Gallant Bess (1946) - Johnny
 The Long Night (1947) - Mac - Bartender (uncredited)
 The Gangster (1947) - Eddie (uncredited)
 Slippy McGee (1948) - Red
 Sleep, My Love (1948) - Drunk (uncredited)
 The Return of October (1948) - Little Max (uncredited)
 Let's Live a Little (1948) - 2nd Cabbie (uncredited)
 Blondie's Secret (1948) - Larry
 Force of Evil (1948) - Comptroller (uncredited)
 Take Me Out to the Ball Game (1949) - Zalinka (uncredited)
 Any Number Can Play (1949) - Taxi Driver (uncredited)
 Abbott and Costello Meet the Killer, Boris Karloff (1949) - Joe, Reporter (uncredited)
 Free for All (1949) - McGuinness
 On the Town (1949) - Cab Company Owner (uncredited)
 Blonde Dynamite (1950) - John Zero 'Dynamite' Bacchuss
 Appointment with Danger (1950) - Goddard's Taxi Driver (uncredited)
 Kill the Umpire (1950) - Fireman (uncredited)
 The Gunfighter (1950) - Townsman at Funeral (uncredited)
 David Harding, Counterspy (1950) - Customer (uncredited)
 Gasoline Alley (1951) - Giffin, Salesman / Con Man (uncredited)
 Navy Bound (1951) - Seaman 'Warthog' Novak
 Lullaby of Broadway (1951) - Joe the Bartender (uncredited)
 Fighting Coast Guard (1951) - Medic / Interne (uncredited)
 Strangers on a Train (1951) - Boatman (uncredited)
 Let's Go Navy! (1951) - Sailor with Nuramo tattoo
 Lost Continent (1951) - Air Police Sergeant
 The Steel Fist (1952) - Nicholas
 Here Come the Marines (1952) - Cpl. Stacy
 Because You're Mine (1952) - Supply Sergeant (uncredited)
 Army Bound (1952) - Military Police Sergeant
 No Holds Barred (1952) - Barney
 The Jazz Singer (1952) - Taxi Driver (uncredited)
 Jalopy (1953) - Red Baker
 Trouble Along the Way (1953) - Bus Driver (uncredited)
 Murder Without Tears (1953) - Jim, the Bartender
 Arena (1953) - Medic (uncredited)
 Vice Squad (1953) - Cop (uncredited)
 Devil's Canyon (1953) - Driver-Guard (uncredited)
 Three Sailors and a Girl (1953) - Marine (uncredited)
 Highway Dragnet (1954) - Ice Cream Truck Driver
 Tanganyika (1954) - Paul Duffy (uncredited)
 Security Risk (1954) - Mike
 Jungle Gents (1954) - Fats Lomax (uncredited)
 Women's Prison (1955) - Mae's Boyfriend (uncredited)
 The Big Tip Off (1955) - Dan Curry - Gambler
 Las Vegas Shakedown (1955) - House Manager
 Jail Busters (1955) - Gus
 The McConnell Story (1955) - Sergeant (uncredited)
 Slightly Scarlet (1956) - Hood (uncredited)
 Chain of Evidence (1957) - Charlie (uncredited)
 Hold That Hypnotist (1957) - Gale
 Calypso Joe (1957) - Transfer Man
 Baby Face Nelson (1957) - Alex - Bank Guard
 The Geisha Boy (1958) - GI in Korea (uncredited)
 The Young Philadelphians (1959) - Diner Counterman (uncredited)
 Say One for Me (1959) - Otto (uncredited)
 The Leech Woman (1960) - Drunk (uncredited)
 Ocean's 11 (1960) - Deputy (uncredited)
 The Ladies Man (1961) - Butcher (scenes deleted)
 Walk on the Wild Side (1962) - Diner in Teresina's Cafe (uncredited)
 What Ever Happened to Baby Jane? (1962) - Projectionist (uncredited)
 It's Only Money (1962) - 2nd Cop on Pier (uncredited)
 Papa's Delicate Condition (1963) - Gambler (uncredited)
 The Nutty Professor (1963) - Gym Attendant (uncredited)
 The Three Stooges Go Around the World in a Daze (1963) - Gus
 The Patsy (1964) - Bowler (uncredited)
 The Disorderly Orderly (1964) - Patient (uncredited)
 The Munsters (1964) - "Tin-Can man" 
 The Outlaws Is Coming (1965) - Chief Crazy Horse
 The Adventures of Bullwhip Griffin (1967) - Police Officer (uncredited)
 The Big Mouth (1967) - Ed - Motorcycle Officer (uncredited)
 Where Were You When the Lights Went Out? (1968) - Passenger (uncredited)
 Hook, Line & Sinker (1969) - Member - Board of Inquiry (uncredited) (final film role)

References

External links

1904 births
1984 deaths
Male actors from New York City
American male film actors
Burials at Hollywood Forever Cemetery
20th-century American male actors